Docket may refer to:

Docket (court), the official schedule of proceedings in lawsuits pending in a court of law.
Agenda (meeting) or docket, a list of meeting activities in the order in which they are to be taken up
Receipt or tax invoice, a proof of payment for items purchased
Transport document, e.g. Air Waybill, Bill of Lading or CMR